Finsceal Beo (Gaelic for "living legend") (foaled 19 February 2004 in Ireland) is a European champion thoroughbred racehorse.

She is one of only two horses ever to win both the Irish 1,000 Guineas and the English 1,000 Guineas. She missed her chance at a "Triple" when she ran second in France to Darjina in the 2007 Poule d'Essai des Pouliches at Longchamp Racecourse.

Stud Record

2010 Finsceal Fior (IRE) : Bay colt, foaled 1 January, by Galileo (IRE) - unraced due to injury, standing at Greenhills Stud, Co. Waterford

2011 Too The Stars (IRE) : Chestnut filly, foaled 25 February, by Sea The Stars (IRE) - won 1 race and placed twice from 4 starts in England 2014

2012 Ol' Man River (IRE) : Bay colt, foaled 7 March, by Montjeu (IRE) - won 2 races from 2 starts in Ireland 2014, including G2 Beresford S, the Curragh

2013 An Cailin Orga (IRE) : Chestnut filly, foaled 19 March, by Galileo (IRE) - won 1 race and placed once from 3 starts in 2016 to date 10/06/16

2014 La Figlia (IRE) : Chestnut filly, foaled 25 March, by Frankel (GB) - unraced to date 10/05/16

2015 Chesnut filly by Frankel (GB)

2016 Colt by Dubawi (IRE)

References
 racingpost.co.uk –Finsceal Beo's race record

2004 racehorse births
Racehorses bred in Ireland
Racehorses trained in Ireland
Cartier Award winners
Irish Classic Race winners
Thoroughbred family 22-d
1000 Guineas winners